The British Society for Developmental Biology (BSDB) is a scientific society promoting developmental biology research; it is open to anyone with an interest in the subject who agrees with the principles of the Society.

History
The British Society for Developmental Biology was founded in 1948 as the London Embryologists’
Club. In 1964, the club was expanded into a scientific society, named the Society for Developmental Biology. In 1964, the Society for the Study of Growth and Development in the United States had also voted to take on the same name, and they took over sponsorship of the journal Developmental Biology in 1966. Consequently, the smaller British society changed to its current name in 1969.

Awards

The society administers four annual awards and a studentship. The Waddington Medal was first awarded in 1998. It is named after C. H. Waddington, a leading British embryologist and geneticist, and is awarded to "an outstanding individual who has made major contributions to any aspect of Developmental Biology in the UK".

Award winners include:

 1998 Cheryll Tickle
 1999 Rosa Beddington
 2000 Peter Lawrence
 2001 Mike Bate
 2002 Jonathan Slack
 2003 Julian Lewis
 2004 Jeff Williams
 2005 Michael Akam
 2006 Claudio Stern
 2007 David Ish-Horowicz
 2008 Pat Simpson
 2009 Liz Robertson
 2010 Robin Lovell-Badge
 2011 Christopher Wylie
 2012 Alfonso Martinez Arias
 2013 Jim Smith
 2014 Philip Ingham
 2015 Lewis Wolpert
 2016 Enrico Coen
 2017 William Harris
 2018 Richard Lavenham Gardner

In 2016, the society added the Cheryll Tickle Medal, which is awarded to a mid-career female scientist. It is named after the embryologist Cheryll Tickle, the first winner of the Waddington Medal. Winners include:

 2016 Abigail Saffron Tucker 
 2017 Jenny Nichols
 2018 Christiana Ruhrberg
 2019 Bénédicte Sanson

The society also has awards for early career scientists: The Beddington Medal is awarded annually for the "best PhD thesis in developmental biology" defended in the year prior to the award; the Dennis Summerbell Lecture is an award that is delivered annually by a junior researcher at either PhD or postdoctoral level; and summer studentships are available for undergraduate students.

References

External links
 Official website

British biology societies
Developmental biology
Organizations established in 1948